Kilwa Masoko Airport  is an airport serving the town of Kilwa Masoko in the Lindi Region of Tanzania. Its one of three airports in Lindi Region and the one that serves northern Lindi.

Airlines and destinations

See also

List of airports in Tanzania
Transport in Tanzania

References

External links

Tanzania Airports Authority
OpenStreetMap - Kilwa Masoko
OurAirports - Kilwa Masoko

Airports in Tanzania
Buildings and structures in the Lindi Region